Leonard Beard (27 April 1895 – 21 March 1978) was a New Zealand cricketer. He played in one first-class match for Wellington in 1927/28.

See also
 List of Wellington representative cricketers

References

External links
 

1895 births
1978 deaths
New Zealand cricketers
Wellington cricketers
People from Carterton, New Zealand